R series

 Adventure R series – paramotors for gliders
 BL R-series engine – gasoline car engines
 Dennis R series – coach chassis
 Ford R series – busses
 International Harvester R series – trucks
 Mack R series – heavy-duty trucks
 R series – Renard number series in mathematics
 Samsung Galaxy R series – Android smartphones
 Scania R series – trucks
 Sony Ericsson R series, a series of cell phones

See also
 Q series (disambiguation)
 S series (disambiguation)